Shahababad may refer to:
 Shahababad, Fars
 Shahababad, Kerman